Prežganje is a settlement in the hills east of Ljubljana in Slovenia. It belongs to the City Municipality of Ljubljana. It is part of the traditional region of Lower Carniola and is now included with the rest of the municipality in the Central Slovenia Statistical Region.

The local parish church is dedicated to Saint Margaret and  belongs to the Roman Catholic Archdiocese of Ljubljana. It is a Baroque church built in 1777.

References

External links

Prežganje on Geopedia

Populated places in the City Municipality of Ljubljana
Sostro District